Troy Laundry Building may refer to:

 Troy Laundry Building (Portland, Oregon)
 Troy Laundry Building (Seattle)